Miao Fu, was a Chinese imperial painter during the Xuande era of the Ming Dynasty. His birth and death years are unknown.

Miao Fu was born in Suzhou. He was known for painting swimming fish.

Notes

References
 Zhongguo gu dai shu hua jian ding zu (中国古代书画鑑定组). 2000. Zhongguo hui hua quan ji (中国绘画全集). Zhongguo mei shu fen lei quan ji. Beijing: Wen wu chu ban she. Volume 10.

Ming dynasty painters
Year of death unknown
Painters from Suzhou
Year of birth unknown